Greg or Gregory Williams may refer to:
Greg Williams (American football coach) (born 1976), American football coach in the NFL
Greg Williams (Australian footballer) (born 1963), Australian rules football in the AFL
Greg Williams (basketball) (born 1947), American college and professional women's basketball coach
Greg Williams (comics), American comic creator
Greg Williams (photographer) (born 1972), British editorial and film photographer
Greg Williams (safety) (born 1959), American football safety in the NFL
Greg Williams (sportscaster) (born 1960), American radio personality
Greg Williams, member of the band Switch (1976–present)
Gregory Alan Williams (born 1956), American actor and author
Gregory B. Williams (born 1969), American judge
Gregory H. Williams (born 1943), American academic
Woody Williams (Gregory Scott Williams, born 1966), former Major League Baseball pitcher

See also
Gregg Williams (born 1958), American football coach